Abdul Sattar Moosa Didi (alternative name: Amir Abdul Sattar Faamudheyri Kilegefaanu) was Maldivian diplomat and politician. He was born 1936 or 1937. He died in November 2015 in Bangkok.

Life
Didi started his public service career as secretary at the Representative Office of the Maldives in Colombo in 1957. Then from 1960 to 1967 he was the representative in Ceylon. He was then Permanent Representative to the United Nations in New York City from 1967 to 1970, and ambassador to the USA between 1968 and 1970. In the government of President Ibrahim Nasir, he was Finance Minister from October 1970 to March 1975. Between October 1975 and May 1977 he was one of the Vice Presidents of the Maldives together with Ahmad Hilmy Didi, Ibrahim Shihab, Ali Maniku and Hassan Zareer.

During the tenure of Nasir's successor, Maumoon Abdul Gayoom, he was Minister of Education in the late 1970s. He was later Minister for Fisheries in the 1980s and, most recently, Minister for Health and Welfare in the 1990s. In 1998 Didi became chair of the council of the Maldives College of Higher Education (MCHE), which was renamed Maldives National University in 2011. During the mass demonstrations in September 2003, he chaired a presidential commission to investigate the circumstances surrounding the death of Evan Naseem, who previously died in prison with two other inmates under unexplained circumstances.

On 26th July 2011, Abdul Sattar Moosa Didi was conferred the Order of the Distinguished Rule of Izzuddin.

References

1930s births
2015 deaths
Vice presidents of the Maldives
Education ministers of the Maldives
Finance ministers of the Maldives
Fisheries ministers of the Maldives
Health ministers of the Maldives
Ambassadors of the Maldives
Ambassadors of the Maldives to the United States
High Commissioners of the Maldives to Sri Lanka
Permanent Representatives of the Maldives to the United Nations
Dhivehi people